Soghan may refer to:
Soghan District
Soghan Rural District